Cycle two of Australia's Next Top Model premiered on 4 January 2006 on Fox8. Thirteen contestants  were chosen to share an inner city apartment in Sydney for eight weeks while they were competing for the title of Australia's Next Top Model. The cycle's tagline was "Game On!".

The prizes for this cycle included a two-year modelling contract with Chic Model Management, an all expenses paid trip to New York City to meet with Next Model Management, an eight-page editorial in Cleo magazine, a national campaign for Napoleon cosmetics, A$1,500 worth of Lovable lingerie and sleepwear, a Samsung E530 mobile phone, and a cash prize of A$1,000.

The winner of the competition was 19-year-old Eboni Stocks from Hobart, Tasmania.

Cast

Contestants
(Ages stated are at start of contest)

Judges
 Erika Heynatz
 Alex Perry
 Georges Antoni
 Victoria Fisher

Other cast members
Michael Azzolini – personal stylist

Episodes

Results

 The contestant was eliminated outside of judging panel.
 The contestant was eliminated.
 The contestant was absent from elimination, but saved
 The contestant quit the competition.
 The contestant won the competition.

Average call-out order
Final two is not included.

Bottom two

 The contestant was eliminated after her first time in the bottom two
 The contestant was eliminated after her second time in the bottom two
 The contestant was eliminated in the final judging and placed as the runner-up

Notes

References

2006 American television seasons
Australia's Next Top Model seasons
Television shows filmed in Australia